Anthribola is a genus of beetles in the family Cerambycidae, containing the following species:

 Anthribola decorata Bates, 1879
 Anthribola femorata Waterhouse, 1882
 Anthribola niviguttata Fairmaire, 1902
 Anthribola quinquemaculata (Waterhouse, 1875)

References

Dorcasominae